General Zhou Chunquan (Chinese: 周纯全; Pinyin: Zhōu Chúnquán; October 6, 1905 – July 28, 1985) is a general in the People's Liberation Army of China.

Zhou was born in Huang'an (Now Hong'an County), Hubei Province. He joined Kuomintang (KMT) in July 1926, and joined the Communist Party of China in November that year. He fought in Huangma Uprising in November 1927.

In October 1932, he was appointed as the political commissar of the tenth division of Red Fourth Army. In June 1933, he was promoted to the political commissar of Red Fourth Army. He participated the Long March in 1935. He was appointed as the director of the general political department of Red Fourth Army Group, and the political commissar of Red 31st Army.

He was the political commissar of the logistics department of Chinese People's Volunteer Army in 1951. When he returned to homeland in 1953, he was promoted to the No. 1 vice director and vice political commissar of the general logistics department of PLA.

He was made general in 1955.

People's Liberation Army generals from Hubei
1905 births
1985 deaths
Members of the Kuomintang
Politicians from Huanggang
Chinese Communist Party politicians from Hubei
People's Republic of China politicians from Hubei
Burials at Babaoshan Revolutionary Cemetery